Leonpolis Manor is a former residential manor in Leonpolis village, Ukmergė district.

References

Manor houses in Lithuania
Classicism architecture in Lithuania